Australia has competed in swimming at the Summer Olympics since the 1900 Summer Olympics in Paris, after only sending a runner, Edwin Flack, to the 1896 Summer Olympics. Frederick Lane was Australia's sole swimming representative at the 1900 Games, winning two individual gold medals. Women's events were added at the 1912 Summer Olympics in Stockholm; Fanny Durack and Mina Wylie, Australia's first female representatives, won gold and silver in the 100-metre freestyle, which was the first women's event on the program. At the 1908 Summer Olympics and the 1912 Summer Olympics, Australia competed as Australasia, sending a combined team with New Zealand. The table includes Malcolm Champion, a New Zealander who was part of the 4×200-metre freestyle relay team that captured gold in 1912.

Australia has won a total of 71 gold medals in the sport, second only to the United States, who have won 257. East Germany is in third place with 38 golds, although this is widely attributed to state-sponsored systematic doping programs.

Swimming is Australia's most prolific Olympic sport, having been responsible for 71 of Australia's 167 Olympic gold medals. In addition, a list of the top 100 Australian Olympians of all time, compiled by the Australian Olympic Committee, named 35 swimmers in the top 100, more than any other sport. Swimmers have been given the honour of carrying the Australian flag six times in twelve at the closing ceremony, which is traditionally reserved for the most successful athlete of the delegation.

Australia's strongest-ever performance in swimming was at the 1956 Olympics on home soil in Melbourne. Australia claimed eight of the thirteen gold medals available, including both relays and a clean sweep of the medals in the 100-metre freestyle, considered the blue-riband event for both men and women. This is the only time that Australia has topped the medal tally in swimming, and the tally of gold medals was not surpassed until Australia won 9 at the Tokyo 2020 Summer Olympics, when the swimming program had expanded to its current 35 events.

Australia has been most successful in the freestyle discipline, with 37 of the 58 golds coming in the stroke. Eight of the gold have come from the men's 1500-metre freestyle, the most victories in the event by any country, which has resulted in the event being dubbed "Australia's race" by Australian commentators. Australia's first medal outside of freestyle did not come until 1932 when Clare Dennis and Bonnie Mealing won gold and silver in the 200-metre breaststroke and 100-metre backstroke respectively. It was not until John Davies' victory in the 200-metre breaststroke in 1952 that a male swimmer had won a medal outside of freestyle. Backstroke is Australia's weakest discipline, with David Theile's two consecutive golds in the 100-metre backstroke being the only victories in the discipline until Kaylee McKeown's double golds in Tokyo 2020 Summer Olympics.

Individual medallists

The following table includes only medals won by Australian swimmers in individual events.
 Shane Gould won three gold, one silver, and one bronze, all in individual events at her only Olympics, aged 15. In doing so, she became the first woman to win three individual gold medals at one Olympics all in world record time. She is the only Australian to win five individual medals and three individual gold medals at one Olympics.
 Ian Thorpe and Gould are the most decorated Australian Olympic medallists in all sports.
 Dawn Fraser won three consecutive gold medals in 1956, 1960, and 1964 in the 100-metre freestyle, becoming the first swimmer to win any event three times.
 Murray Rose and Ian Thorpe have both won the 400-metre freestyle twice, while Kieren Perkins and Grant Hackett have won the 1500-metre freestyle twice. David Theile has won the 100-metre backstroke twice, the only Australian to have won a backstroke event. All were won consecutively.

All medallists
The following table includes all those who have won medals, including as part of relay teams. Since 1984, swimmers who participated in the preliminary heats but not in the final were awarded medals if the final team went on to claim a medal, whereas those prior to 1984 did not. Those who swam in the heats only are marked with an asterisk, multiple times if multiple medals were awarded for swimming in heats only. Malcolm Champion, a member of the 4×200-metre freestyle relay team in 1912, was a New Zealander, competing as part of the combined Australasia team. His teammates in the combined relay team were Cecil Healy, Les Boardman, and Harold Hardwick.
 Ian Thorpe and Emma McKeon are the most decorated Australian Olympians of all time, in terms of gold medals with five each. 
 Emma McKeon's seven medals, four gold and three bronze, at the 2020 Summer Olympics are the largest total in a single Olympics by an Australian. McKeon's career total of eleven medals is the most by any Australian Olympian.
 Dawn Fraser and Murray Rose jointly held the previous records for gold medals, and Fraser the record of eight medals in total, prior to Thorpe.
 Sandra Morgan, a member of the Australian women's 4×100-metre freestyle relay team in 1956, is the youngest Australian gold medallist of all time, aged 14 years and 6 months.

See also

 Australia at the Olympics
 Australian Olympic Committee
 List of Olympic medalists in swimming (men)
 List of Olympic medalists in swimming (women)
 Swimming at the Summer Olympics
 Swimming Australia

Notes

References
 

 
 
 
 
Australian
Swimming
Australia at the Summer Olympics
Swimming in Australia